Pineglen was a bulk carrier owned and operated by Canada Steamship Lines.
She was built at the Collingwood Shipyards, in Collingwood, Ontario in 1985, to a single superstructure lake freighter design. Initially named Paterson, the vessel was sold to Canada Steamship Lines in 2002 and renamed. Unlike more modern lake freighters she was built to a "straight-deck" design – i.e. she was not equipped with a self-unloading boom. The vessel was sold for scrap in 2017.

Design and description

Career
The ship was built for N.M. Paterson & Sons Limited, and was the last vessel to be built at the Collingwood Shipyards. The vessel was launched on 18 April 1985 and completed in June. N.M. Paterson operated her as Paterson from her first voyage on 27 June 1985, until March 2002. Following the ship's transfer, the vessel was renamed Pineglen. The vessel mainly carried grain on eastbound voyages and iron ore on westbound voyages.

Pineglen under the command of Captain Feroze Irani was presented with the ceremonial top hat at Lock 3, for being the first vessel to transit the Welland Canal, the westernmost part of the Saint Lawrence Seaway, when it officially opened for its 176th consecutive year of service on 23 May 2005. She was the last vessel to use the Saint Lawrence Seaway in 2007. She was the first vessel to transit Snell Lock in 2012.

In 2017 she was sold for scrap to be broken up in Turkey.

References

Citations

Sources

External links

Bulk carriers
Canada Steamship Lines
1985 ships